Lasolo River is a river in Southeast Sulawesi province, Sulawesi island, Indonesia, about 1700 km northeast of the capital Jakarta. Tributaries include the Lalindu River.

Geography
The river flows in the southeast area of Sulawesi with predominantly tropical monsoon climate (designated as Am in the Köppen-Geiger climate classification). The annual average temperature in the area is 25 °C. The warmest month is October, when the average temperature is around 28 °C, and the coldest is June, at 24 °C. The average annual rainfall is 2495 mm. The wettest month is July, with an average of 337 mm rainfall, and the driest is September, with 28 mm rainfall.

See also
List of rivers of Indonesia
List of rivers of Sulawesi

References

Rivers of Southeast Sulawesi
Rivers of Indonesia